Henry Fischer (October 16, 1843 – 1912) was a member of the Wisconsin State Assembly.

Biography
Fischer was born on October 16, 1843 in Chicago. After the outbreak of the American Civil War, he enlisted with the 2nd Missouri Volunteer Infantry (3 months, 1861) and later the 2nd Missouri Volunteer Infantry of the Union Army. Conflicts he took part in include the Camp Jackson Affair, the Battle of Boonville, the Battle of Pea Ridge, as well as the Battle of Perryville. During the Battle of Perryville, Fischer was severely wounded by a gunshot to the leg. As a result, he was discharged. The following year, he moved to Milwaukee, Wisconsin and re-enlisted in the Army with the Veteran Reserve Corps. Fischer died in 1912. He was buried at Forest Home Cemetery.

Assembly career
Fischer was a member of the Assembly in 1879. He was a Republican.

References

See also

Politicians from Chicago
Politicians from Milwaukee
Republican Party members of the Wisconsin State Assembly
People of Wisconsin in the American Civil War
Union Army soldiers
American shooting survivors
1843 births
1912 deaths
Burials in Wisconsin
19th-century American politicians